Tolga Ünlü (born 10 September 1989) is a German professional footballer who plays as a defender for Turkish club Altay. He is a youth product of Viktoria Aschaffenburg.

External links

 Tolga Ünlü TFF Profile

1989 births
Living people
German footballers
German people of Turkish descent
Erzurumspor footballers
Konyaspor footballers
Viktoria Aschaffenburg players
Süper Lig players
Association football fullbacks